Alvina Reynolds is a Saint Lucian politician who has been president of the Senate of Saint Lucia since 2022. She represented the Babonneau constituency for the Saint Lucia Labour Party from 2011 to 2016. She is the first female Member of Parliament for that area. She was the Minister for Health, Wellness, Human Services and Gender Relations. She won her seat in the 2011 general election and lost the seat in the 2016 general election. She was appointed as a government member of the senate on 28 July 2021 and became senate president on 24 November 2022.

Reynolds graduated with a Bachelor of Philosophy in Education (BPhil) degree from the University of Birmingham in 1997.

References

External links
Alvina Reynolds' profile at the Saint Lucia Labour Party's website

21st-century Saint Lucian politicians
21st-century Saint Lucian women politicians
Alumni of the University of Birmingham
Alumni of the University of East London
Government ministers of Saint Lucia
Living people
Members of the House of Assembly of Saint Lucia
Presidents of the Senate of Saint Lucia
Saint Lucia Labour Party politicians
Women government ministers of Saint Lucia
Year of birth missing (living people)